Gornji Lipovac may refer to:

 Gornji Lipovac, Serbia, a village near Brus
 Gornji Lipovac, Croatia, a village near Nova Kapela